LNCT University is a private university in Bhopal, Madhya Pradesh, India. It was established in 2015 by the LNCT (Laxmi Narain  College of Technology) Group.

References

External links

Social Media

Private universities in India
Educational institutions established in 2015
2015 establishments in Madhya Pradesh